John Carroll may refer to:

People

Academia and science 
Sir John Carroll (astronomer) (1899–1974), British astronomer
John Alexander Carroll (died 2000), American history professor
John Bissell Carroll (1916–2003), American cognitive scientist
John M. Carroll (information scientist) (active since born 1950), American information scientist
John L. Carroll, American legal academic

Literature
John Francis Carroll (1858–1917), newspaper publisher and editor
John Carroll (journalist) (1942–2015), American journalist and editor
John Carroll (author) (born 1944), Australian conservative writer

Politics 
John M. Carroll (politician) (1823–1901), U.S. Representative from New York
John Lee Carroll (1830–1911), American politician in Maryland
John Carroll (mayor) (1836–1903), mayor of Dunedin
John E. Carroll (1877–1955), Mayor of Seattle
John A. Carroll (1901–1983), American jurist and politician in Colorado
John Carroll (Ohio politician) (died 1985), member of the Ohio House of Representatives
John Carroll (Manitoba politician) (1921–1986), Canadian politician in Manitoba
John Carroll (Hawaii politician) (1929–2021), member of the Hawaii Senate and House of Representatives
John Carroll (trade unionist) (active 1969–1990), Irish trade unionist and senator

Religion
John Carroll (archbishop of Baltimore) (1735–1815), prelate of the Roman Catholic Church
John Carroll (bishop of Shrewsbury) (1838–1897), Irish-born prelate of the Roman Catholic Church
John Patrick Carroll (1864–1925), bishop of Helena, Montana
John Carroll (Australian bishop) (1865–1949), Irish-born Roman Catholic bishop of Lismore, Australia

Sports
John Carroll (rugby union) (1934–1998), Australian rugby union player
John Carroll (basketball) (born 1955), American basketball coach
John Carroll (cricketer) (born 1972), English cricketer
John Carroll (hurler) (born 1978), Irish hurler

Other people 
John Carroll (soldier) (1891–1971), Australian Victoria Cross recipient
John Wesley Carroll (1892–1959), American modernist painter
John Carroll (actor) (1906–1979), American actor
John F. Carroll (1932–1969), American patient of gigantism
Jack the Bulldog, mascot of the Georgetown University Hoyas athletics teams whose incarnations are named John Carroll or similar

Other uses 
Bishop John Carroll (statue), a statue of John Carroll at Georgetown University
John Carroll Society, an organization for Catholic laypersons
John Carroll University, a Catholic Jesuit school in Ohio
The John Carroll School, a Catholic secondary school in Maryland

See also 
Jack Carroll (disambiguation)
John Carrell (disambiguation)
Johnny Carroll (disambiguation)
Jon Carroll (born 1943), American journalist
Jonathan Carroll (disambiguation)
John Caryll (disambiguation)
John Carroll Catholic High School (disambiguation)
John Carroll Lynch (born 1963), American actor